Idolatteria simulatrix is a species of moth of the family Tortricidae. It is found in Guatemala.

The wingspan is about 25 mm. The forewings are reddish orange, with a few white scales. There is a series of ten dark reddish-purple costal streaks at the extreme base of the costa. The hindwings are reddish orange, with eight purplish marginal spots.

References

Moths described in 1914
Archipini